I kveld med Thomas Giertsen was a Norwegian talkshow hosted by Thomas Giertsen, that aired on TVNorge.

The show premiered on 13 September 1999 and aired every Monday and Thursday.

Guests
Incomplete list of guests who has appeared on I kveld med Thomas Giertsen.

Lene Marlin
Lene Nystrøm
Åse Kleveland
Harald Eia
Espen Thoresen
Linn Skåber
Gustav Lorentzen
Jahn Ivar Jakobsen
Mette C. Iversen
Nils Vogt
Bård Tufte Johansen
Kinky Friedman

External links
Thomas' kveld med Lene (Norwegian)
Filmfront.no

References

TVNorge original programming
Norwegian television talk shows
1999 Norwegian television series debuts
1999 Norwegian television series endings
1990s Norwegian television series